Juan Andrés Rodríguez Silva (born September 27, 1971) is a Guatemalan equestrian rider. At age thirty-seven, Rodriguez made his official debut for the 2008 Summer Olympics in Beijing, where he competed in the jumping event, along with his horse Orestus VDL. He placed forty-first at the end of the qualifying rounds, with a total of thirty-one penalties.

References

External links
NBC 2008 Olympics profile 

1971 births
Living people
Guatemalan male equestrians
Olympic equestrians of Guatemala
Equestrians at the 2008 Summer Olympics
Pan American Games competitors for Guatemala
Equestrians at the 2007 Pan American Games
Equestrians at the 2011 Pan American Games
Equestrians at the 2015 Pan American Games
Equestrians at the 2019 Pan American Games
Central American and Caribbean Games silver medalists for Guatemala
Central American and Caribbean Games bronze medalists for Guatemala
Competitors at the 2002 Central American and Caribbean Games
Central American and Caribbean Games medalists in equestrian